James O'Barr (born January 1, 1960) is an American comics artist, writer and graphic artist, best known as the creator of the comic book series The Crow.

Early life
O'Barr, an orphan, was raised in the foster care system.

Career
In 1978, O'Barr enlisted in the Marines. While stationed in Germany, he illustrated combat manuals for the military.

Before entering the Marines, O'Barr's fiancée, Beverly, had been killed by a drunk driver. While living in Berlin in 1981, O'Barr began work on his comic The Crow as a means of dealing with his personal tragedy. O'Barr was further inspired by a Detroit newspaper account of the murder of a young couple over a $20 engagement ring. In The Crow, the protagonist, Eric, and his fiancée, Shelly, are murdered by a gang of criminals. Eric then returns from the dead, guided by a supernatural crow, to hunt their killers.

After his discharge from the Marines, O'Barr continued his painting and illustration as well as doing various odd jobs, including working for a Detroit body shop. The Crow sat on a shelf for seven years, but at last he found a publisher with Gary Reed of Caliber Press. The first miniseries was published in 1989. The Crow has since sold more than 750,000 copies worldwide.

O'Barr's own hope that his project would result in a personal catharsis went unfulfilled. During an interview in 1994, he said, "[A]s I drew each page, it made me more self-destructive, if anything... There is pure anger on each page".

In the 1990s O'Barr was affiliated with the experimental metal band Trust Obey, which was signed briefly to Trent Reznor's Nothing label. Trust Obey released the album Fear and Bullets: Music to Accompany The Crow in 1993. The album was packaged with a special edition of The Crow graphic novel.

The Crow was adapted into a successful film of the same name in 1994, which was marred by the tragic death of its star, Brandon Lee, during filming. The film went on to spawn three sequels and a television series.

After the success of The Crow film, O'Barr began planning a post-apocalyptic graphic novel series entitled Gothik. The series was based on The Wizard of Oz and featured "Jonny Z" from his short story "Frame 137" as the main character.

In January 2013 Motionworks Entertainment released O'Barr's western comic, Sundown, which served as their debut motion comic for iPhone and iPad. He also announced his work on a comic about the Korean War, centered on the efforts of three US Marine guncrews to hold Fox Hill during the Battle of Chosin Reservoir, with a different artist drawing each gun crew.

In 2013, O'Barr was named as a consultant on a possible reboot of The Crow film franchise. Although previously opposed to the project, in an October 2014 interview, O'Barr spoke about his involvement in the reboot of The Crow. He discussed the approach to the adaptation and efforts being made to respect the original film. Later, in November 2014, O'Barr appeared at the Wizard World Tulsa Comic Con and stated that he was co-writing the script with screenwriter Cliff Dorfman.

Personal life

As of the mid-2000s, O'Barr resided in Dallas with his fiancée Chiara Bautista. His son, Erik, is a PhD candidate at
Columbia University where he studies Ottoman history. Erik’s wife, Sharon, is a leading architectural historian.

Bibliography

References

External links

 
 James O'Barr at ComicBookDB.com

1960 births
Living people
American comics writers
American comics artists
United States Marines
Artists from Detroit
Artists from Texas